Jane Rogoyska is British writer and filmmaker of Polish origin, best known for her books Gerda Taro: Inventing Robert Capa, Kozlowski (2020 Desmond Elliott Prize longlist), and Surviving Katyn (2022 Mark Lynton History Prize winner).

Background

Rogoyska's grandfather served in Intelligence during the 1910s-1920s and, as deputy director of the Bank of Poland when World War II started, fled with his family on a government train that helped take gold secretly out of the country.  Rogoyska's father grew up in England and married an Englishwoman.  Rogoyska grew up in England and only learned Polish as an adult.  She received an MA in modern languages from Christ's College, Cambridge University and an MA in film production from the Northern Film School (Leeds) and Polish National Film School (Łodź).

Career

Rogoyska made short films and commercials until 2010, when she refocused on writing, with particular interest in the 1930s through the Cold War.  The 2013 book Gerda Taro: Inventing Robert Capa explores Taro's life and relationship with Capa.  The 2021 book Surviving Katyn examines the history of the Katyn Massacre.  During research, she discovered that her own great-uncle Ludwik Rynkowski was one of the victims at Katyn.

Rogoyska has also taught at the National Film & Television School, Derby University, Greenwich University, Royal College of Music, and the University of London.

Works

Books
 Gustav Klimt with Patrick Bade (2011)
 Gerda Taro: Inventing Robert Capa (2013)
 Kozlowski (2019)
 Polska Britannica by Czesław Siegieda (introduction) (2020)
 Surviving Katyn:  Stalin's Polish Massacre and the Search for Truth (2021)

Radio & Theatre
 Shooting with Light (2015-2016)
 Still Here: A Polish Odyssey (2018)

 Short Films (writer/director)
 I Don’t - NSFTV/FUJI Scholarship (1995)
 A Quiet Laugh - PWSFT/NSFTV/STO Films (1996)
 Waiting for the Light - Tin Fish Films (1998)
 Funeral of the Last Gypsy King - Arcane Pictures/London Production Fund (1999)
 Not Waving - Arcane Pictures (2001)

Awards
 1995:  for I Don’t:  
 BAFTA nomination
 MGM prize (Fuji Scholarship Competition)
 1996:  for A Quiet Laugh:  Special Jury Prize (Balticum Festival)
 1999:  for Funeral of the Last Gypsy King:
 Best Short Film (San Diego International Film Festival)
 Special Jury Prize (Festival de Cine de Huesca)
 Audience Award (International Short Film Festival of Siena
 2020: Desmond Elliott Prize longlist of the National Centre for Writing
 2022:  Mark Lynton History Prize for Surviving Katyn: Stalin's Polish Massacre and the Search for Truth (2021)

See also
 Katyn Massacre
 Gerda Taro

References

External links
 JaneRogoyska.com
 IMDB.com
 OneWorld bio
 Holland House bio
 Royal Literary Fund bio
 David Highham Associates bio
 Travels Through Time:   The Katyń Massacre (2021.05.21)
 History Extra Pdcast: Uncovering the truth about WW2's Katyn massacre (2021.05.07)

British people of Polish descent
21st-century British women writers
British women film directors
British women historians
Year of birth missing (living people)
Living people